The Hopewell Subdivision is a railroad line owned by CSX Transportation in the U.S. state of Virginia. At its north end it continues south from the Bellwood Subdivision and at its south end the track comes to an end.

See also
 List of CSX Transportation lines

References

CSX Transportation lines
Rail infrastructure in Virginia
Seaboard Air Line Railroad